Anass Essayi (Arabic: أنس الساعي; born 18 May 2001) is a Moroccan runner.

The athlete won the silver medal in the 1,500 meters at the 2018 All-Africa Youth Games in Algiers as well as the 2018 Youth Olympic Games in Buenos Aires. He later won the bronze medal in the 1,500 meters at the 2021 Pan Arab Athletics Championships in Rades.

Essayi represented Morocco at the 2020 Tokyo Olympics, where he competed in the Men's 1500m.

He was studying Business Administration at Al Akhawayn University in August 2021 and in 2022 is a student at University of South Carolina.

NCAA
Essayi won the 2022 Southeastern Conference Indoor Track and Field Championship men's mile in a personal best time 3:57.37 at Texas A&M Gilliam Indoor Track Stadium.

References

External links

 
 
 

 

2001 births
Living people
Moroccan male middle-distance runners
Olympic athletes of Morocco
Olympic male middle-distance runners
Athletes (track and field) at the 2020 Summer Olympics
Athletes (track and field) at the 2018 Summer Youth Olympics
Athletes (track and field) at the 2018 African Youth Games
South Carolina Gamecocks men's track and field athletes
21st-century Moroccan people